Strengberg is a town in the district of Amstetten in Lower Austria in Austria.

Geography
Strengberg lies in the Mostviertel in Lower Austria between Linz and Amstetten south of the Danube. About 17 percent of the municipality is forested.

References

Cities and towns in Amstetten District